William Beckett may refer to:

William Beckett (British politician) (1784–1863), English politician, Member of Parliament for Leeds and Ripon
Ernest Beckett, 2nd Baron Grimthorpe (Ernest William Beckett, 1856–1917), British politician, sometimes referred to as William Beckett
William Beckett (engineer) (1862–1956), British railway engineer and soldier
Gervase Beckett (William Gervase Beckett, 1866–1937), English politician
William Beckett (Australian politician) (1870–1965), Victorian state politician
William Beckett (singer) (born 1985), American singer, frontman of the band The Academy Is...

See also
William à Beckett (1806–1869), Chief Justice of Victoria, Australia 
Billy Beckett (1915–1998), English footballer
Beckett (disambiguation)
William Becket (1684–1738), English surgeon and antiquary